In physics and mathematics, the Ikeda map is a discrete-time dynamical system given by the complex map

The original map was proposed first by Kensuke Ikeda as a model of light going around 
across a nonlinear optical resonator (ring cavity containing a nonlinear dielectric medium) in a more general form. In particular
the parameter  is called dissipation parameter characterizing
the loss of resonator, and in the limit of   the Ikeda map becomes
a conservative map.

The original Ikeda map is often used in another modified form in order
to take the saturation effect of nonlinear dielectric medium into account:

A 2D real example of the above form is:

where u is a parameter and

For , this system has a chaotic attractor.

Attractor
This  shows how the attractor of the system changes as the parameter  is varied from 0.0 to 1.0 in steps of 0.01. The Ikeda dynamical system is simulated for 500 steps, starting from 20000 randomly placed starting points. The last 20 points of each trajectory are plotted to depict the attractor.

Point trajectories
The inset plot on the left shows an estimate of the attractor while the inset on the right shows a zoomed in view of the main trajectory plot.

Octave/MATLAB code for point trajectories

The Octave/MATLAB code to generate these plots is given below:

% u = ikeda parameter
% option = what to plot
%  'trajectory' - plot trajectory of random starting points
%  'limit' - plot the last few iterations of random starting points
function ikeda(u, option)
    P = 200; % how many starting points
    N = 1000; % how many iterations
    Nlimit = 20; % plot these many last points for 'limit' option
 
    x = randn(1, P) * 10; % the random starting points
    y = randn(1, P) * 10;
 
    for n = 1:P,
        X = compute_ikeda_trajectory(u, x(n), y(n), N);
     
        switch option
            case 'trajectory' % plot the trajectories of a bunch of points
                plot_ikeda_trajectory(X); hold on;
             
            case 'limit'
                plot_limit(X, Nlimit); hold on;
             
            otherwise
                disp('Not implemented');
        end
    end
 
    axis tight; axis equal
    text(- 25, - 15, ['u = ' num2str(u)]);
    text(- 25, - 18, ['N = ' num2str(N) ' iterations']);
end

% Plot the last n points of the curve - to see end point or limit cycle
function plot_limit(X, n)
    plot(X(end - n:end, 1), X(end - n:end, 2), 'ko');
end

% Plot the whole trajectory
function plot_ikeda_trajectory(X)
    plot(X(:, 1), X(:, 2), 'k');
    % hold on; plot(X(1,1),X(1,2),'bo','markerfacecolor','g'); hold off
end

% u is the ikeda parameter
% x,y is the starting point
% N is the number of iterations
function [X] = compute_ikeda_trajectory(u, x, y, N)
    X = zeros(N, 2);
    X(1, :) = [x y];
 
    for n = 2:N
     
        t = 0.4 - 6 / (1 + x ^ 2 + y ^ 2);
        x1 = 1 + u * (x * cos(t) - y * sin(t));
        y1 = u * (x * sin(t) + y * cos(t));
        x = x1;
        y = y1;
     
        X(n, :) = [x y];
     
    end
end

Python code for point trajectories
import math

import matplotlib.pyplot as plt
import numpy as np

def main(u, points=200, iterations=1000, nlim=20, limit=False, title=True):
    """
    Params
        u:float
            ikeda parameter
        points:int
            number of starting points
        iterations:int
            number of iterations
        nlim:int
            plot these many last points for 'limit' option. Will plot all points if set to zero
        limit:bool
            plot the last few iterations of random starting points if True. Else Plot trajectories.
        title:[str, NoneType]
            display the name of the plot if the value is affirmative
    """
    
    x = 10 * np.random.randn(points, 1)
    y = 10 * np.random.randn(points, 1)
    
    for n in range(points):
        X = compute_ikeda_trajectory(u, x[n][0], y[n][0], iterations)
        
        if limit:
            plot_limit(X, nlim)
            tx, ty = 2.5, -1.8
            
        else:
            plot_ikeda_trajectory(X)
            tx, ty = -30, -26
    
    plt.title(f"Ikeda Map ({u=:.2g}, {iterations=})") if title else None
    return plt

def compute_ikeda_trajectory(u, x, y, N):
    """
    Calculate a full trajectory
    Params
        u:float
            is the ikeda parameter
        x,y float:
            coordinates of the starting point
        N:int
            the number of iterations
    """
    X = np.zeros((N, 2))
    
    for n in range(N):
        X[n] = np.array((x, y))
        
        t = 0.4 - 6 / (1 + x ** 2 + y ** 2)
        x1 = 1 + u * (x * math.cos(t) - y * math.sin(t))
        y1 = u * (x * math.sin(t) + y * math.cos(t))
        
        x = x1
        y = y1   
        
    return X

def plot_limit(X, n):
    """
    Plot the last n points of the curve - to see end point or limit cycle
    Params
        X:np.array
            trajectory of an associated starting-point
        n:int
            number of "last" points to plot
    """
    plt.plot(X[-n:, 0], X[-n:, 1], 'ko')

def plot_ikeda_trajectory(X):
    """
    Plot the whole trajectory
    Params
        X:np.array
            trajectory of an associated starting-point
    """
    plt.plot(X[:,0], X[:, 1], 'k')

if __name__ == '__main__':
    main(.9, limit=True, nlim=0).show()

References

Chaotic maps
Articles with example MATLAB/Octave code
Articles containing video clips